Veguita is a census-designated place  in Socorro County, New Mexico, United States. Its population was 232 as of the 2010 census. Veguita has a post office with ZIP code 87062. New Mexico State Road 304 passes through the community. Veguita has two independent Christian churches, Chihuahua Bible Chapel, and Iglesia Evangelica "Camino De Fe", which share facilities on Carlos Martinez Road. One community fixture is "Veguita Trading Post"  which has a fueling station, and provides commodities. There also is the Mission Church of the Catholic Diocese. In 2015, the Veguita community welcomed KVNM-LP 101.1 FM, one of two low power FM Radio Stations in Socorro County. Veguita is the home of iDea Ministries, which is the owner-operator of KVNM-LP 101.1 FM, and produces "Jazz, Power, & The Glory!".

Demographics

Education
Its school district is Belén Consolidated Schools. Belén High School is the district's comprehensive high school.

References

Census-designated places in New Mexico
Census-designated places in Socorro County, New Mexico